Cochran is an unincorporated community located in Brunswick County, in the U.S. state of Virginia.

The settlement is located along a former railroad. The Richmond, Petersburg and Carolina Railroad, passing through Cochran from Petersburg, Virginia to Ridgeway Junction (today Norlina, North Carolina), was completed in 1900, at which point it was merged into the Seaboard Air Line (SAL). By 1914, the population of Cochran was estimate by the railroad to be somewhere around 200. The Seaboard line (dubbed the "S-line" after later mergers) continued to operate until the 1980s, and today Cochran is along the abandoned portion of the CSX Norlina Subdivision.

References

Unincorporated communities in Virginia
Unincorporated communities in Brunswick County, Virginia